Jauravia pubescens, is a species of lady beetle native to India, and Sri Lanka.

Description
Body length is about 2.5 mm. Body sub-hemispherical. Dorsum yellowish brown to brown. Eyes are black. Elytral external border is pale. Ventrum slightly light brown. Epipleura and legs are yellowish brown. Head with very fine and sparse punctures. Head clothed with moderately long, delicate, golden and dense pubescence. Pronotum moderately emarginate anteriorly. Pronotal punctures are coarse with pubescence similar to head. Elytral punctures are moderately fine. Elytral interspaees are smooth, bright and shine. Ventrum with minute and very sparse punctures. Ventrum clothed with short, golden, sub-depressed and sparse pubescence.

It is a predator of Megapulvinaria maxima, Cydia leucostoma and Opisina arenosella.

References 

Coccinellidae
Insects of Sri Lanka
Beetles described in 1798